These are the Billboard Hot Dance/Disco Club Play and Maxi-Singles Sales number-one hits of 1997.

See also
1997 in music
List of number-one dance hits (United States)
List of artists who reached number one on the U.S. Dance chart

References

1997
1997 record charts
1997 in American music